Ojaq (also Romanized as Ojāq; also known as Ojagh and Ūchāq) is a village in Sardrud-e Olya Rural District, Sardrud District, Razan County, Hamadan Province, Iran. At the 2006 census, its population was 621, in 121 families.

References 

Populated places in Razan County